The 1984 English cricket season was the 85th in which the County Championship had been an official competition. West Indies and Sri Lanka toured England. On the domestic front the County Championship was retained by Essex who also won the Sunday League.

Honours
County Championship - Essex
NatWest Trophy - Middlesex
Sunday League - Essex
Benson & Hedges Cup - Lancashire
Minor Counties Championship - Durham
MCCA Knockout Trophy - Hertfordshire
Second XI Championship - Yorkshire II 
Wisden - Martin Crowe, Larry Gomes, Geoff Humpage, Jack Simmons, Sidath Wettimuny

Test series

West Indies tour

Sri Lanka tour

County Championship

NatWest Trophy

Benson & Hedges Cup

Sunday League

Leading batsmen

Leading bowlers

References

External sources
 Britannic Assurance County Championship 1984 at CricketArchive
 Benson and Hedges Cup 1984 at CricketArchive
 John Player Special League 1984 at CricketArchive
 Minor Counties Championship 1984 at CricketArchive

Annual reviews
 Playfair Cricket Annual 1985
 Wisden Cricketers' Almanack 1985

English cricket seasons in the 20th century
English Cricket Season, 1984
Cricket season